Annely Ojastu (born 10 August 1960 in Tartu) is an Estonian Paralympic athlete. At the 1992 Barcelona Games, she won a silver medal in the Women's 100 m TS4 event. At the 1996 Atlanta Games, she won a gold medal in the Women's 100 m T42–46 event and two silver medals in the Women's 200 m T42–46 and Women's Long Jump F42–46 events.

Ojastu is the daughter of track and field athletes Eino Ojastu and Linda Ojastu (née Kepp). Her younger brother Aivar Ojastu was also a successful track and field athlete.

References

1960 births
Living people
Paralympic athletes of Estonia
Athletes (track and field) at the 1992 Summer Paralympics
Athletes (track and field) at the 1996 Summer Paralympics
Paralympic gold medalists for Estonia
Paralympic silver medalists for Estonia
Sportspeople from Tartu
Medalists at the 1996 Summer Paralympics
Medalists at the 1992 Summer Paralympics
Paralympic medalists in athletics (track and field)
Estonian female sprinters
Estonian female long jumpers